Richard Kenneth Gunn (16 February 1871 – 23 June 1961) was a British boxer, and is the oldest man to win an Olympic boxing crown ever. He achieved this feat at the age of 37 years and 254 days.

Biography
He was born in Charing Cross, London and died in Lambeth, London.

Gunn took up boxing at the Surrey Commercial Docks Boxing Club in 1893 after joining his father's East End tailoring business. He won the 1894, 1895 and 1896 Amateur Boxing Association British featherweight title, when boxing out of the various clubs. 

He was so much better than his rivals at the time that authorities asked him to retire after he won his third ABA title. Gunn did so, but in 1908, having served on the ABA council for more than ten years, he returned to win the Olympic title before hanging up his gloves for good. Gunn died in London aged 90, having only lost one fight in fifteen years.

1908 Olympic results
Below is the record of Richard Gunn, a British featherweight boxer who competed at the 1908 London Olympics:

 Quarterfinal: defeated Etienne Poillot (France) by second-round knockout
 Semifinal: defeated Thomas Ringer (Great Britain) by decision, 2-0
 Final: defeated Charles Morris (Great Britain) by decision, 2-0 (won gold medal)

References

External links
 
 

1871 births
1961 deaths
Boxers from Greater London
English male boxers
Featherweight boxers
Olympic boxers of Great Britain
Boxers at the 1908 Summer Olympics
English Olympic medallists
Olympic gold medallists for Great Britain
Olympic medalists in boxing
Medalists at the 1908 Summer Olympics
England Boxing champions